The University of St Andrews (abbreviated as St And, from the Latin Sancti Andreae, in post-nominals) is a public university in St Andrews, Scotland. It is the oldest of the four ancient universities of Scotland and, following the universities of Oxford and Cambridge, the third-oldest university in the English-speaking world. St Andrews was founded in 1413 when the Avignon Antipope Benedict XIII issued a papal bull to a small founding group of Augustinian clergy. Along with the universities of Glasgow, Edinburgh, and Aberdeen, St Andrews was part of the Scottish Enlightenment during the 18th century.

St Andrews is made up of a variety of institutions, comprising three colleges — United College (a union of St Salvator's and St Leonard's Colleges), St Mary's College, and St Leonard's College, the last named being a non-statutory revival of St Leonard's as a post-graduate society. There are 18 academic schools organised into four faculties. The university occupies historic and modern buildings located throughout the town. The academic year is divided into two semesters, Martinmas and Candlemas. In term time, over one-third of the town's population are either staff members or students of the university. The student body is known for preserving ancient traditions such as Raisin Weekend, May Dip, and the wearing of distinctive academic dress.

The student body is also notably diverse: over 145 nationalities are represented with about 45% of its intake from countries outside the UK; a tenth of students are from Europe with the remainder from the rest of the world—20% from North America alone.  Undergraduate admissions are among the most selective in the country, with the university having the third-lowest offer rate for 2022 entry (behind only Oxford and Cambridge) and the highest entry standards of new students, as measured by UCAS entry tariff, at 209 points.

In the Good University Guide 2022, St Andrews was ranked as the best university in the UK, the first university to ever top Oxford and Cambridge in British rankings. In The Guardian University Guide 2023, St Andrews achieved the same feat and ranked first for the first time in the guide's history.  St Andrews has many notable alumni and affiliated faculty, including eminent mathematicians, scientists, theologians, philosophers, and politicians. Recent alumni include the former first minister of Scotland Alex Salmond; former Cabinet Secretary Mark Sedwill; former Chief of the Secret Intelligence Service (MI6) Alex Younger; Olympic cycling gold medalist Chris Hoy; Permanent Representative of the United Kingdom to the United Nations Dame Barbara Woodward; and royals William, Prince of Wales, and Catherine, Princess of Wales. Five Nobel laureates are among St Andrews' alumni and former staff: three in Chemistry and two in Physiology or Medicine.

History

Foundation

The university was founded in 1410 when a group of Augustinian clergy, driven from the University of Paris by the Avignon schism and from the universities of Oxford and Cambridge by the Anglo-Scottish Wars, formed a society of higher learning in St Andrews, which offered courses of lectures in divinity, logic, philosophy, and law. A charter of privilege was bestowed upon the society of masters and scholars by the Bishop of St Andrews, Henry Wardlaw, on 28 February 1411–12. Wardlaw then successfully petitioned the Avignon Pope Benedict XIII to grant the school university status by issuing a series of papal bulls, which followed on 28 August 1413. King James I of Scotland confirmed the charter of the university in 1432. Subsequent kings supported the university, with King James V of Scotland "confirming privileges of the university" in 1532.

A college of theology and arts, called St John's College, was founded in 1418 by Robert of Montrose and Lawrence of Lindores. St Salvator's College was established in 1450 by Bishop James Kennedy. St Leonard's College was founded in 1511 by Archbishop Alexander Stewart, who intended it to have a far more monastic character than either of the other colleges. St John's College was refounded by Cardinal James Beaton under the name St Mary's College in 1538 for the study of divinity and law. It was intended to encourage traditional Catholic teachings in opposition to the emerging Scottish Reformation, but once Scotland had formally split with the Papacy in 1560, it became a teaching institution for Protestant clergy. At its foundation in 1538 St Mary's was intended to be a college for instruction in divinity, law, and medicine, as well as in Arts, but its career on this extensive scale was short-lived. Under a new foundation and erection, confirmed by Parliament in 1579, it was set apart for the study of Theology only, and it has remained a Divinity College ever since.

Some university buildings that date from this period are still in use today, such as St Salvator's Chapel, St Leonard's College Chapel and St Mary's College quadrangle. At this time, the majority of the teaching was of a religious nature and was conducted by clerics associated with the cathedral.

Development

During the 17th and 18th centuries, the university had mixed fortunes and was often beset by civil and religious disturbances. In a particularly acute depression in 1747, severe financial problems triggered the dissolution of St Leonard's College, whose properties and staff were merged into St Salvator's College to form the United College of St Salvator and St Leonard. Throughout this period student numbers were very low; for instance, when Samuel Johnson visited the university in 1773, the university had fewer than 100 students, and was in his opinion in a steady decline. He described it as "pining in decay and struggling for life". The poverty of Scotland during this period also damaged St Andrews, as few were able to patronise the university and its colleges, and with state support being improbable, the income they received was scarce.

Modern period

Women
In the second half of the 19th century, pressure was building upon universities to open up higher education to women. In 1876, the university senate decided to allow women to receive an education at St Andrews at a level roughly equal to the Master of Arts degree that men were able to take at the time. The scheme came to be known as the 'LLA examination' (Lady Literate in Arts). It required women to pass five subjects at an ordinary level and one at honours level and entitled them to hold a diploma from the university. Not being required to attend the university in person, the women were learning by correspondence, taking as many years as needed  to complete the course. They were both examined and assisted  in their studies by  educationalists  in the  town or city in which they lived in the UK or abroad.

In 1889 the Universities (Scotland) Act made it possible to formally admit women to St Andrews and to receive an education equal to that of male students. In September 1892, the university was reported as having "lately taken the lead in opening its classes to women"  and proclaimed  that "St Andrews hails a ladies' school –  St Leonards  – second to none in the land, and probably second to few in England". By 1892, the headmistress of St  Leonard's Ladies School, Dame Frances Dove, had  become "possessor" of the buildings of the university's old St Leonard's College  which were being used again for their original purpose of providing accommodation for university students, only this time not for males but for "girl graduates and undergraduates".

Having matriculated, Agnes Forbes Blackadder entered the university in 1892 and became the first woman to graduate from St Andrews on the same level as men on 29 March 1895, when she gained her MA. In response to the increasing number of female students attending the university, the first women's hall of residence was founded  in 1896 by  Dame Louisa Lumsden, the first principal of St Leonards School, which adjoined the university. The residence  was named University Hall.

Dundee
Until the start of the 20th century, St Andrews offered a traditional education based on classical languages, divinity and philosophical studies, and was slow to embrace more practical fields such as science and medicine that were becoming more popular at other universities. In response to the need for modernisation and in order to increase student numbers and alleviate financial problems, the university had, by 1883, established a university college in Dundee  which  formally merged with St Andrews in 1897. From its inception, the Dundee college had a focus on scientific,  and professional subjects; the college's mixed sexes read Classics and  English at St Andrews. The union was fraught with difficulties; in 1894,  The Educational Times reported in the article The Quarrel between St Andrews and Dundee  that University College, Dundee  was "forbidden" to give such instruction in the Arts  "as he [the Dundeen student] might require".  After the incorporation of University College Dundee, St Andrews' various problems generally receded. For example, it was able to offer medical degrees. Until 1967 many students who obtained a degree from the University of St Andrews had in fact spent most, and sometimes all, of their undergraduate career based in Dundee.

In 1967, the union with Queen's College Dundee (formerly University College Dundee) ended, when it became an independent institution under the name of the University of Dundee. As a result of this, St Andrews lost its capacity to provide degrees in many areas such as Medicine, Dentistry, Law, Accountancy, and Engineering.  As well as losing the right to confer the undergraduate medical degree MBChB, it was also deprived of the right to confer the postgraduate degree MD. St Andrews was eventually able to continue to offer the opportunity to study medicine through a new arrangement with the University of Manchester in England.

In 1972, the College of St Leonard was reconstituted as a postgraduate institute.

Links with the United States
St Andrews' historical links with the United States predate the country's independence. James Wilson, a signer of the Declaration of Independence, attended (but did not graduate from) St Andrews. Wilson was one of six original justices appointed by George Washington to the Supreme Court of the United States and was a founder of the University of Pennsylvania Law School. Other prominent American figures associated with St Andrews include Scottish American industrialist Andrew Carnegie, who was elected Rector in 1901 and whose name is given to the prestigious Carnegie Scholarship, and Edward Harkness, an American philanthropist who in 1930 provided for the construction of St Salvator's Hall. American Bobby Jones, co-founder of the Augusta National Golf Club and the Masters Tournament, was named a Freeman of the City of St Andrews in 1958, becoming only the second American to be so honoured, the other being Benjamin Franklin in 1759.

Links with the United States have been maintained into the present day and continue to grow. In 2009, Louise Richardson, an Irish-American political scientist specialising in the study of terrorism, was drawn from Harvard to serve as the first female Principal and Vice Chancellor of St Andrews. She later went on to her next appointment as the vice chancellor to the University of Oxford.

Active recruitment of students from North America first began in 1984, with Americans now making up around 1 in 6 of the student population in 2017. Students from almost every state in the United States and province in Canada are represented. This is the highest proportion and absolute number of American students amongst all British universities. Media reports indicate growing numbers of American students are attracted to the university's academics, traditions, prestige, internationalism, and comparatively low tuition fees. The university also regularly features as one of the few non-North American universities in the Fiske Guide to Colleges, an American college guide, as a 'Best Buy'. St Andrews has developed a sizable alumni presence in the United States, with over 8000 alumni spread across all 50 states. Most major cities host alumni clubs, the largest of which is in New York. Both London and New York also host the St Andrews Angels, an alumni led angel investment network, which centres upon the wider university communities in both the United Kingdom and United States. St Andrews has also established relationships with other university alumni clubs and private membership clubs in the United States to provide alumni with social and networking opportunities. For example, alumni are eligible for membership at the Princeton Club of New York, the Penn Club of New York City and the Algonquin Club in Boston.

In 2013, Hillary Clinton, former United States Secretary of State, took part in the academic celebration marking the 600th anniversary of the founding of the University of St Andrews. Clinton received an honorary degree of Doctor of Laws and provided the graduation address, in which she said,

Governance and administration

As with the other ancient universities of Scotland, the governance of the university is determined by the Universities (Scotland) Act 1858. This act created three bodies: the General Council, University Court and Academic Senate (Senatus Academicus).

General Council

The General Council is a standing advisory body of all the graduates, academics and former academics of the university. It meets twice a year and appoints a business committee to manage business between these meetings. Its most important functions are to appoint two assessors to the University Court and elect the university's chancellor.

University Court
The University Court is the body responsible for administrative and financial matters, and is in effect the governing body of the university. It is chaired by the rector, who is elected by the matriculated students of the university. Members are appointed by the General Council, Academic Senate and Fife Council. The president of the Students' Association and director of education are ex officio members of the court. Several lay members are also co-opted and must include a fixed number of alumni of the university.

Senatus Academicus
The Academic Senate (Latin Senatus Academicus) is the supreme academic body for the university. Its members include all the professors of the university, certain senior readers, a number of senior lecturers and lecturers and three elected student senate representatives – one from the arts and divinity faculty, one from the science and medicine faculty and one postgraduate student. It is responsible for authorising degree programmes and issuing all degrees to graduates, and for managing student discipline. The president of the Senate is the University Principal.

University officials

The university's three most significant officials are its chancellor, principal, and rector, whose rights and responsibilities are largely derived from the Universities (Scotland) Act 1858.

The Chancellor of the University of St Andrews is the titular head of the University of St Andrews. Their duties include conferring degrees, promoting the university's image throughout the world, and furthering the university's interests within and outwith Scotland.

The Principal is the chief executive of the university and is assisted in that role by several key officers, including the deputy principal, Master of the United College and Quaestor. The principal has responsibility for the overall running of the university and presides over the University Senate.

In Scotland, the position of Rector exists at the four ancient universities (St Andrews, Glasgow, Aberdeen and Edinburgh) – as well as the University of Dundee. The post was made an integral part of these universities by the Universities (Scotland) Act 1889. The rector of the University of St Andrews chairs meetings of the University Court, the governing body of the university; and is elected by the matriculated student body to ensure that their needs are adequately considered by the university's leadership. Through St Andrews' history a number of notable people have been elected to the post, including the actor John Cleese, industrialist and philanthropist Andrew Carnegie, author and poet Rudyard Kipling and the British Prime Minister Archibald Primrose, 5th Earl of Rosebery.

Colleges
The university encompasses three colleges: United College, St Mary's College and St Leonard's College. The purpose of the colleges at St Andrews is mainly ceremonial, as students are housed in separate residential halls or private accommodations. United College is responsible for all students in the faculties of arts, sciences and medicine, and is based around St Salvator's Quadrangle. St Mary's College is responsible for all students studying in the Faculty of Divinity, and has its own dedicated site in St Mary's Quadrangle. St Leonard's College is now responsible for all postgraduate students. In 2022 the university announced its intention to create New College, a fourth college responsible for the schools of international relations, management, and economics and finance. It will be located at the former site of Madras College in the towns' centre, and is expected to cost £100 million.

Faculties and schools
The four academic faculties collectively encompass 18 schools. A dean is appointed by the Master of the United College to oversee the day-to-day running of each faculty. Students apply to become members of a particular faculty, as opposed to the school within which teaching is based. The faculties and their affiliated schools are:

Faculty of Arts: art history, classics, economics, English, film studies, history, international relations, management, modern languages, philosophy, social anthropology.
Faculty of Divinity: divinity.
Faculty of Medicine: medicine.
Faculty of Science: biology, chemistry, computer science, geography and geosciences, mathematics, physics and astronomy, psychology and neuroscience.

Certain subjects are offered both within the Faculties of Arts and Sciences, the six subjects are: economics, geography, management, mathematics, psychology and sustainable development. The content of the subject is the same regardless of the faculty.

Academics

Semesters

The academic year at St Andrews is divided into two semesters, Martinmas and Candlemas, named after two of the four Scottish Term and Quarter Days. Martinmas, on 11 November, was originally the feast of Saint Martin of Tours, a fourth-century bishop and hermit. Candlemas originally fell on 2 February, the day of the feast of the Purification, or the Presentation of Christ. Martinmas semester runs from early September until mid-December, with examinations taking place just before the Christmas break. There follows an inter-semester period when Martinmas semester business is concluded and preparations are made for the new Candlemas semester, which starts in January and concludes with examinations at the end of May. Graduation is celebrated at the end of June.

Rankings and reputation

In the 2022 The Times and Sunday Times Good University Guide, St Andrews ranked as the best university in the UK, the first university to ever top Oxford and Cambridge in a British ranking. In the 2023 Guardian University Guide, St Andrews achieved the same feat and ranked first for the first time in the guide's history. It has been twice named University of the Year by The Times and Sunday Times.
 
In a ranking conducted by The Guardian in 2009, St Andrews placed fifth in the UK for national reputation behind Oxford, Cambridge, Imperial & LSE. When size is taken into account, St Andrews ranks second in the world out of all small to medium-sized fully comprehensive universities (after Brown University) using metrics from the QS Intelligence Unit in 2015.
The university is ranked 5th in Europe by Times Higher Education in its 2019 Teaching Rankings. The 2021 Research Excellence Framework ranked St Andrews 16th in the UK, and second in Scotland, amongst multi-faculty institutions for the research quality (GPA) of its output profile. St Andrews was ranked ninth overall in The Sunday Times 10-year (1998–2007) average ranking of British universities based on consistent league table performance, and is one of only three universities to have never left the top 10 in any of the three main domestic league tables since 2008.

According to data released by the Department for Education in 2018, St Andrews was rated as the fifth best university in the UK for boosting male graduate earnings with male graduates seeing a 24.5% increase in earnings compared to the average graduate, and the ninth best university for females, with female graduates seeing a 14.8% increase in earnings compared to the average graduate. St Andrews is placed seventh in the UK (1st in Scotland) for the employability of its graduates as chosen by recruiters from the UK's major companies. In 2017, St Andrews was named as the university with the joint second highest graduate employment rate of any UK university (along with Warwick), with 97.7 per cent of its graduates in work or further study three and a half years after graduation. An independent report conducted by Swedish investment firm, Skandia found that despite its small undergraduate body, St Andrews is the joint-5th best university in the UK for producing millionaires. A study by High Fliers confirmed this by reporting that the university also features in the top 5 of UK universities for producing self-made millionaires. According to a study by the Institute of Employment Research, St Andrews has produced more directors of FTSE 100 companies in proportion to its size than any other educational institution in Britain.

In the 2019 Complete University Guide, 24 out of the 25 subjects offered by St Andrews rank within the top 10 nationally, making St Andrews one of only three multi-faculty universities (along with Cambridge and Oxford) in the UK to have over 95% of their subjects in the top 10. The Times and Sunday Times Good University Guide 2017 revealed that 24 of the 26 subjects offered by St Andrews ranked within the top 6 nationally with 10 subjects placing within the top 3 including English, Management, Philosophy, International Relations, Italian, Physics and Astronomy and Classics and Ancient History. The Guardian University Guide 2019 ranked Biosciences, Computer Science, International Relations, Physics and Psychology first in the UK. Earth and Marine Sciences, Economics, English, Management, Mathematics, Philosophy and Theology placed within the top three nationally. In the 2015–16 Times Higher Education World University Rankings, St Andrews is ranked 46th in the world for Social Sciences, 50th in the world for Arts and Humanities and 74th in the world for Life Sciences. The 2014 CWTS Leiden rankings, which "aims to provide highly accurate measurements of the scientific impact of universities", placed St Andrews 39th in the world, ranking it fifth domestically. The philosophy department is ranked sixth worldwide (3rd in Europe) in the 2020 QS World University Rankings.

Admissions

The university receives applications mainly through UCAS and the Common Application with the latest figures showing that there are generally 12 applications per undergraduate place available. According to 2021 UCAS figures, the university had an offer rate of 25.0% for undergraduate applicants – the fourth lowest amongst mainstream higher education institutions (behind only Oxford, Cambridge and LSE). The university is one of the most competitive universities to gain admission into, with successful undergraduate entrants holding 208 UCAS points (the equivalent of A*A*AA at A Level) ranking it as the highest amongst higher education institutions in the UK for the 2019 admissions cycle. The standard offer of a place tends to require five best Highers equivalent to AAAAB, three best A-levels equivalent to AAA or a score of at least 38 points on the International Baccalaureate. For 2016–17, the acceptance rate was 8.35% and the offer rate was 22.5% for Scottish/EU applicants where places are capped by the Scottish Government. In 2017, the most competitive courses for Scottish/EU applicants were those within the Schools of International Relations, Management, and Economics and Finance with offer rates of 8.0%, 10.9% and 11.5% respectively. The university has a higher proportion of female than male students with a female ratio of 59.7% in the undergraduate population.

Under 40% of the student body is from private schools and the university has one of the smallest percentages of students (13%) from lower income backgrounds, out of all higher education institutions in the UK. According to data from UCAS, St Andrews' offer rate to students from the most deprived areas (as measured by SIMD20) has increased from 28% in 2010 to 72.1% for entry in 2022, almost three times higher than the university's overall offer rate for all students. The university participates in widening access schemes such as the Sutton Trust Summer School, First Chances Programme, REACH & SWAP Scotland, and Access for Rural Communities (ARC) in order to promote a more widespread uptake of those traditionally under-represented at university. In the seven-year period between 2008 and 2015, the number of pupils engaged with annual outreach programmes at the university has increased by about tenfold whilst the number of students arriving at St Andrews from the most deprived backgrounds has increased by almost 50 per cent in the past year of 2015.

Lecture series

To commemorate the university's 600th anniversary the 600th Lecture Series was commissioned in 2011, which brought diverse speakers such as former prime minister Gordon Brown, naturalist David Attenborough and linguist Noam Chomsky to St Andrews.

As part of the celebration of the 400th establishment of the King James Library, the King James Library lectures were initiated in 2009 on the subject of 'The Meaning of the Library'.

The Andrew Lang Lecture series was initiated in 1927, and named for alumnus and poet Andrew Lang. The most famous lecture in this series is that given by J. R. R. Tolkien in March 1939, entitled 'Fairy Stories', but published subsequently as 'On Fairy-Stories'.

The computing Distinguished Lecture Series was initiated in 1969 by Jack Cole.

Exchange programmes
St Andrews has developed student exchange partnerships with universities around the globe, though offerings are largely concentrated in North America, Europe, and Asia. Exchange opportunities vary by School and eligibility requirements are specific to each exchange program.

In North America, the highly competitive Bachelor of Arts International Honours program, run in conjunction with The College of William and Mary in Williamsburg, Virginia, allows students studying Classical Studies, Film Studies, International Relations, English, History, or Economics to spend two years at each institution and earn a joint degree from both. The Robert T. Jones Memorial Trust funds the Robert T. Jones Jr. Scholarship, which allows select St Andrews students to study, fully funded, for a year at Emory University in Atlanta, and Western University and Queen's University in Canada. The Robert Lincoln McNeil Scholarship allows students to study at the University of Pennsylvania.

One of the largest North American exchanges is with the University of California system, in which students can study at UC Berkeley, UC Los Angeles (UCLA), UC Santa Cruz (UCSC) and UC San Diego (UCSD).

Other North American partners offering multiple exchanges include the University of Virginia, the University of North Carolina at Chapel Hill, Washington University in St. Louis, Washington and Lee University, Elon University, and the University of Toronto. Some exchanges are offered within specific research institutes at St Andrews, rather than across entire Schools. For example, the Handa Centre for the Study of Terrorism and Political Violence (CSTPV), within the School of International Relations, offers student exchanges in partnership with the School of Foreign Service at Georgetown University.

St Andrews participates in the Erasmus Programme and has direct exchanges with universities across Europe. For example, in France exchanges are offered at the Sorbonne, Sciences Po, and University of Paris VI. In the Netherlands students can study at Leiden University and Utrecht University. Narrower exchanges include those with the University of Copenhagen, the University of Oslo, and Trinity College Dublin. Exchanges are also available for postgraduate research students, such as the opportunity for social scientists to study at the European University Institute in Florence, Italy.

More recently, St Andrews has developed exchanges with partners in Asia and Australia. Notable partners include the University of Hong Kong and Renmin University of China, National University of Singapore, and the University of Melbourne in Australia.

Buildings, collections and facilities

The University of St Andrews is situated in the small town of St Andrews in rural Fife, Scotland. The university has teaching facilities, libraries, student housing and other buildings spread throughout the town. Generally, university departments and buildings are concentrated on North Street, South Street, The Scores, and the North Haugh. The university has two major sites within the town. The first is the United College, St Andrews (also known as the Quad or St Salvator's) on North Street, which functions both as a teaching space and venue for student events, incorporating the Departments of Social Anthropology and Modern Languages. The second is St Mary's College, St Andrews, based on South Street, which houses the Schools of Divinity, Psychology and Neuroscience, as well as the King James Library. Several schools are located on The Scores including Classics, English, History, Philosophy, the School of Economics and Finance, and International Relations, as well as the Admissions department, the Museum of the University of St Andrews, and the principal's residence, University House. North Street is also the site of several departments, including the principal's office, Younger Hall, Department of Film Studies, and the University Library. The North Haugh is principally home to the Natural Sciences such as Chemistry, Physics, Biology, as well as Mathematics, Computer Science, Medicine and the School of Management.

Libraries and museums

The University of St Andrews maintains one of the most extensive university library collections in the United Kingdom, which includes significant holdings of books, manuscripts, muniments and photographs. The library collection contains over a million volumes and over two hundred thousand rare and antique books.

The university library was founded by King James VI in 1612, with the donation of 350 works from the royal collection, at the urging of George Gledstanes, the then chancellor of St Andrews, although the libraries of the colleges of St Leonard's College, St Salvator's College and St Mary's College had existed prior to this. From 1710 to 1837 the library functioned as a legal deposit library, and as a result has an extensive collection of 18th-century literature.

The library's main building is located on North Street, and houses over 1,000,000 books. The library was designed by the architects Faulkner-Brown Hendy Watkinson Stonor based in North East England at Killingworth. Faulkner-Brown specialised in libraries and leisure facilities and also designed the National Library of Canada in Ottawa and the Robinson Library at Newcastle University In 2011 the main library building underwent a £7 million re-development. The historic King James library, built in 1643, houses the university's Divinity and Medieval history collections.

In 2012 the university purchased the vacant Martyrs' Kirk on North Street, with the purpose of providing reading rooms for the Special Collections department and university postgraduate research students and staff.

The university maintains several museums and galleries, open free to the public. The Museum of the University of St Andrews (MUSA) opened in 2008 and displays some highlights of the university's extensive collection of over 100,000 artefacts. It displays objects relating both to the history of the university, such as its collection of 15th-century maces, and also unrelated objects, such as paintings by John Opie, Alberto Morrocco and Charles Sims. Several of the university's collections have been recognised as being of 'national significance for Scotland' by Museums Galleries Scotland.

The Bell Pettigrew Museum houses the university's natural history collections. Founded in 1912, it is housed in the old Bute Medical School Building in St. Mary's Quad. Among its collections are the remains of several extinct species such as the dodo and Tasmanian tiger as well as fossilised fish from the nearby Dura Den, Fife, which when found in 1859 stimulated the debate on evolution.

Chapels

The university has two collegiate chapels. The chapel of St Salvator's was founded in 1450 by Bishop James Kennedy, and today it is a centre of university life. St Salvator's has a full peal of six bells, and is therefore the only university chapel in Scotland suitable for change ringing. The Chapel of St Leonard's is located in the grounds of the nearby St Leonards School. It is the university's oldest building, some parts dating from 1144 and is the smaller of the two chapels. St Salvator's and St Leonard's both have their own choirs, whose members are drawn from the student body.

Student halls
St Andrews is characterised amongst Scottish universities as having a significant number of students who live in university-maintained accommodation. As of 2012, 52% of the student population live in university halls. The halls vary widely in age and character; the oldest, Deans Court dates from the 12th century, and the newest, Whitehorn Hall, built in 2018. They are built in styles from Gothic revival to brutalist. All are now co-educational and non-smoking, and several are catered. The university guarantees every first year student a place of accommodation, and many students return to halls in their second, third and final years at St Andrews. From September 2015 onward, students have had the option of living in alcohol-free flats in David Russell Apartments on the grounds of medical conditions that do not allow drinking or for religious reasons.

Halls of residence include:

 Agnes Blackadder Hall
 Albany Park (demolished 2019–2021)
 Andrew Melville Hall
 David Russell Apartments
 Fife Park Apartments
 Gannochy House
 Hamilton Hall (Sold in 2006)
 John Burnet Hall
 McIntosh Hall
 Powell Hall (Postgraduate only)
 St Regulus Hall
 St Salvator's Hall
 University Hall
 Whitehorn Hall (addition to University Hall, 2018)
 Angus and Stanley Smith Houses (Postgraduate only)
 Deans Court (Postgraduate only)
 St Gregory's (Postgraduate only)
 Gregory Place (Postgraduate only)

Renewable energy projects

Since 2013, the university's endowment has been invested under the United Nations Principles of Responsible Investment (UNPRI) initiative with a sustainable ethical policy enforced since 2007. The university also funds and administers the international St Andrews Prize for the Environment established in 1998, which awards $150,000 annually to three environmental projects around the globe. The university has the target of being the UK's first carbon net zero university by 2035 and has invested in a biomass centre as well as solar and wind farms. It has spent £70 million on the Eden Campus and requires further funding of £100 million to complete works.

The Guardbridge Biomass Energy Centre will generate power using locally sourced wood-fuelled biomass, hot water will be transported to the university through underground pipes to heat and cool laboratories and student residences. The £25 million project is expected to save 10,000 tonnes of carbon annually and the university aims to establish the site as a knowledge exchange hub which would provide "missing link" facilities to allow research and discoveries made in university labs to be translated to working prototypes. The biomass centre became operational in December 2016 and won the Scottish Green Energy Award in 2023.

In October 2013, the university received permission to build six medium-sized turbines at Kenly Wind Farm, near Boarhills. The wind farms are expected to be operational by 2017 and will bring an estimated £22 million boost to the local and national economy with 19,000 tonnes of carbon saved annually. However, due to concerns raised by the Ministry of Defence over its proximity to Leuchars Station, as of 2021, the project has been halted.

Student life

Students' Association

The University of St Andrews Students' Association is the organisation which represents the student body of the University of St Andrews.
It was founded in 1885 and comprises the students' representative council (SRC) and the Student Activities Forum (SAF) (previously known as the Students' Services Council (SSC)). The Students' Association has 10 SRC subcommittees and 11 SAF subcommittees: SRC: Accommodation, Alumni, BAME Students' Network, Community Relations (ComRels), Disabled Students Network (DSN), Environment, Equal Opportunities (EqualOps), Life Long and Flexible Learners (Lifers), SaintsLGBT+, and Wellbeing. SAF: The Entertainments 'Ents' Committee, Charities Campaign, Union Debating Society, STAR (St Andrews Radio), Mermaids Performing Arts Fund, Design Team, SVS (Student Voluntary Service), the Music Fund (prev. Music is Love), On the Rocks (an annual arts festival), Societies  Committee, and the Postgraduate Society. Every matriculated student is automatically a member of each subcommittee.

The Students' Association Building (informally known as the Union) is located on St Mary's Place, St Andrews. Union facilities include several bars (Main, Beacon, and Sandy's) and the university's Student Support Services. In 2013 the Students' Association Building underwent a refurbishment. The Students' Association is affiliated to, and a founding member of, the Coalition of Higher Education Students in Scotland but unlike many other students' unions in the UK is not a member of the National Union of Students, having most recently rejected membership in a referendum in November 2012.

Societies

St Andrews is home to over 200 student societies which cover a wide range of interests.

The oldest student society in St Andrews is the University of St Andrews Celtic Society which has run continuously without mergers since 1796. It promotes Scottish culture to students of the university and the wider community. Currently it does this through Scottish Country Dance and Scottish Gaelic Language Classes. Its Scottish Country Dance activities are affiliated with the Royal Scottish Country Dance Society (RSCDS).

All matriculated students are members of the "Union Debating Society", a student debating society that holds weekly public debates in Lower Parliament Hall, often hosts notable speakers, and participates in competitive debating in both national and international competitions. Its origins go back to the 1794 founding of the Literary Society, however its current form only dates back to the 1890 merger with the Classical Society. Since its roots can be traced back to 1794, it claims to be the oldest continuously run student debating society in the world.

There is a strong tradition of student media at St Andrews. The university's two newspapers are The Saint, a fortnightly publication and The Stand, an online publication founded in 2011. There is also the Foreign Affairs Review ran by the Foreign Affairs Society and the first legal publication in town – the St Andrews Law Review - was launched in 2020. There are also a number of smaller student publications including The Wynd, a student-run magazine and The Regulus, a student magazine focusing on politics and current affairs. In addition to this there are several student-led academic journals, most notably, Stereoscope Magazine which is focused on student photography and raising awareness of the university's historic photographic collection, Ha@sta, an annual journal for those interested in art history, Aporia, the journal of the Philosophy Society, and the Postgraduate Journal of Art History and Museum Studies. The university's radio station is STAR: St Andrews Radio, an online station that broadcasts 24/7 during term time. Scoot Around is a literary-cultural magazine based in St Andrews with contributors from universities around the world.The Sinner is an independent website and discussion forum set up by students of the university.

The university's Music Society comprises many student-run musical groups, including the university's flagship symphony orchestra, wind band, and chorus. One of the oldest choirs in the university is the St Andrews University Madrigal Group, which performs a concert each term and has an annual summer tour. The A Cappella Society represents all four a cappella groups at St Andrews: The Other Guys, The Alleycats, The Accidentals and The Hummingbirds. From 2009 to 2011, all four of these groups participated in The Voice Festival UK(VF-UK) competition, and The Other Guys, The Accidentals and The Alleycats all reached the London final.

Student theatre at the University of St Andrews is funded by the Mermaids Performing Arts fund. There are regular dramatic and comedic performances staged at the Barron at the Byre Theatre and the Union StAge. Blind Mirth is the university's improvisational theatre troupe, which performs weekly in the town, and annually takes a production to the Edinburgh Fringe Festival.

The Kate Kennedy Club plays a significant role in the life of the university, maintaining university traditions such as the Kate Kennedy Procession, in which students parade through the town dressed as eminent figures from the university's history, and organising social events such as the Opening and May balls. Founded in 1926, the club is composed of around thirty matriculated students, who are selected by the club's members. The club has received criticism from the university's former principal, Louise Richardson, and alumna the Duchess of Cambridge, Kate Middleton, over its previously male-only admission policy. In 2012, the club decided to allow female students to join.

St Andrews is home to several other private clubs, such as The Kensington Club, founded in 1739 by Alexander Laird Balgonie and is an all-male dining club that organises private events for members. The St Andrews Fight Club hosts an annual boxing match, training 20 amateur boxers in an intensive course.

Sports clubs and the Athletic Union

The University of St Andrews Athletic Union is the student representative body for sport. Established in 1901, it is affiliated to BUCS and encompasses around sixty sport clubs, who compete at both a recreational and high-performance level. A notable club is the University of St Andrews Rugby Football Club, which played a pivotal role in shaping the sport and has produced Scottish international players such as J. S. Thomson and Alfred Clunies-Ross.

In 2015, the university underwent a £14 million five-phase development of the student sports centre which included a new 400-seat eight-court sports hall, a new reception area and expanded gym facilities.

The Scottish Varsity, also known as the 'world's oldest varsity match', is played annually against the University of Edinburgh.

Traditions

Sponsio Academica
In order to become a student at the university a person must take an oath in Latin at the point of matriculation, called the Sponsio Academica, although this tradition now has been digitised and is agreed to as part of an online matriculation process.

In English:

We students who set down our names hereunder in all good faith make a solemn promise that we shall show due deference to our teachers in all matters relating to order and good conduct, that we shall be subject to the authority of the Senatus Academicus and shall, whatever be the position we attain hereafter, promote, so far as lies in our power, the profit and the interest in our University of St Andrews. Further, we recognise that, if any of us conducts ourselves in an unbecoming or disorderly manner or shows insufficient diligence in their studies and, though admonished, does not improve, it is within the power of the Senatus Academicus to inflict on such students a fitting penalty or even expel them from the University.

University blessing and grace 
Peter Redford Scott Lang reintroduced a tradition of praying the grace before and after meals when he brought back student common dinners in 1887. According to Lang, the use of Latin graces at student meals had disappeared by the time of Samuel Johnson's visit to St Andrews in 1773. Johnson was astonished that the grace was not recited in Latin, and it was requested that he write a Latin grace for the university. Common meals at the university ceased in 1820 and so did the grace with them. Lang wrote that he learned of the grace from George Edward Day, who himself learned it from an elder retired professor while visiting Sir Benjamin Ward Richardson. At dinner, the retired professor recited a short grace, explaining that Johnson's grace was so long that the president could not remember it except for one sentence: Sit nomen domini benedictum (blessed be the name of the Lord). The shorter grace became the standard until common dinners ceased to occur. Reinstituting common student dinners in 1887, Lang reintroduced the university blessing and university grace.

Due to the story of the composition of the graces by Samuel Johnson, there has previously been a belief that the University of St Andrews' graces derived from Johnson's alma mater, Pembroke College, Oxford. According to a historian of the University of St Andrews, Ronald Gordon Cant, the current graces and the music settings composed for them "although based on traditional forms, these forms had no specific connection with earlier St Andrews usage, and bear no resemblance whatsoever to the old Pembroke grace". Thus, Cant states that the current graces "were specially composed for the Common Dinners instituted in 1887".

University Blessing:Sit nomen Domini Benedictum per Jesum Christum salvatorem nostrum. Amen.

(Blessed be the name of the Lord through Jesus Christ, our Saviour. Amen.)University Grace:

Before Meat:Gloria Patri Filio Spirituique Sancto In Saecula Saeculorum. Amen.

(Glory be to the Father, the Son, and the Holy Spirit. World Without End. Amen.)After Meat:Deo Gratias.

(Thanks be to God.)

Gowns

One of the most conspicuous traditions at St Andrews is the wearing of academic dress, particularly the distinctive red undergraduate gown of the United College. Undergraduates in Arts and Science subjects can be seen wearing these garments at the installation of a rector or chancellor, at chapel services, on 'Pier Walks', at formal hall dinners, at meetings of the Union Debating Society, and giving tours to prospective students and visitors as well as on St Andrews Day. Divinity students wear a black undergraduate gown with a purple saltire cross on the left facing. Postgraduates wear the graduate gown or, as members of St Leonard College, may wear a black gown trimmed with burgundy, introduced for graduate students whose original university is without academic dress. (See Academic dress of the University of St Andrews.) St Mary's College Post Graduates, however, wear their graduate gown with a purple saltire cross on the left facing.

Bejant
Bejant is a term used to refer to first year male students; females being described as Bejantines. Second-year students are known as a Semis, a student in their third year may be referred to as a Tertian, and in their final year as a Magistrand. These terms are thought to be unique to St Andrews. When wearing their traditional red gowns, students in each year may be identified according to the way they wear their gowns. In the first year, the gown is worn on the shoulders, in the second year it is worn slightly off the shoulders. In the third year arts students wear their gowns off their left shoulders, and science students off their right shoulders. Finally, fourth years wear their gowns right down to their elbows, ready to shed their scarlet gowns for the black graduation gown. The gown is never to be joined at the top as this is considered bad luck.

Academic parents
The students of the university enjoy an unusual family tradition designed to make new students feel at home and build relationships within the student body. Traditionally, a Bejant or Bejantine acquires academic parents who are at least in their third year as students. These older students act as informal mentors in academic and social matters and it is not uncommon for such academic family ties to stretch well beyond student days. Tradition has it that a Bejant may ask a man to be his Senior Man but must be invited by a woman who is prepared to be his Senior Woman. Similarly, a Bejantine may ask a male to be her Senior Man but there is no overt rule regarding how she acquires a Senior Woman. The establishment of these relationships begins at the very start of the first semester – with the aim of being in place ahead of Raisin Weekend.

Raisin Weekend

Raisin Weekend celebrates the relationship between the Bejants/Bejantines (first-year students) and their respective academic parents who, in St Andrews' tradition, guide and mentor them in their time at the university. It is traditionally said that students went up to study with a sack of oatmeal and a barrel of salt-herring as staple foods to last them a term and that, therefore, anything more exotic was seen as a luxury. In return for the guidance from academic parents a further tradition sprang up of rewarding these "parents" with a pound of raisins. Since the 19th century the giving of raisins was steadily transformed into the giving of a more modern alternative, such as a bottle of wine (although presents are now rarely expected). In return for the raisins or equivalent present, the parents give their "children" a formal receipt — the Raisin Receipt — composed in Latin. Over time this receipt progressively became more elaborate and often humorous. The receipt can be written on anything and is to be carried everywhere by the Bejant/Bejantine on the morning of Raisin Monday until midday.

Raisin Weekend is held annually over the last weekend of October. Affairs often begin with a tea party (or similar) thrown by the mother(s) and then a pub-crawl or house party led by the father(s). It is fairly common for several academic families to combine in the latter stages of the revels. At midday all the First-Years gather in Quad of St Salvator's College to compare their receipts and also to be open to challenge from older students who may look for errors in the Latin of the receipt (an almost inevitable occurrence). Upon detection of such error(s) the bearer may be required to sing the Gaudie. In more recent years the gathering has culminated in a shaving foam fight. Since 2014, the foam fight has been moved from St Salvator's Quad to the adjacent Lower College Lawn. Raisin Weekend has also become synonymous with binge drinking and a certain amount of humiliation of "academic children", commonly involving embarrassing costumes or drinking games. The University Students' Association provides a special First Aid hotline for Raisin Weekend.

The Curse of Patrick Hamilton
Situated around the town of St Andrews are cobblestone markings denoting where Protestant martyrs were burnt at the stake. To students, the most notable of these is the cobblestone initials "PH" located outside the main gate of St Salvator's College. These cobblestones denote where Patrick Hamilton was martyred in 1528. According to student tradition, stepping on the "PH" will cause a student to become cursed, with the effect that the offender will fail his or her degree and so students are known to jump over the cobblestones when passing. The 'curse' is said to be lifted by participating in the May Dip.

May Dip
The May Dip is a student tradition held annually at dawn on May Day. Students usually stay awake until dawn, at which time they collectively run into the North Sea to the sound of madrigals sung by the University Madrigal Group. Students purportedly do so to cleanse themselves of any academic sins (which they may have acquired by stepping on the PH cobblestone) before they sit exams in May. In 2011, the event was "officially" moved by the Students' Association to East Sands in response to concerns for health and safety in its former location on Castle Sands.

Publications
The Centre for the Study of Terrorism and Political Violence (CSTPV), within the School of International Relations, publishes the online open-access journal Contemporary Voices: St Andrews Journal of International Relations (formerly Journal of Terrorism Research).

Notable people

Alumni
 

Notable University of St Andrews alumni include King James II of Scotland; United States Declaration of Independence signatory James Wilson (1761); Governor General of Canada John Campbell; discoverer of logarithms John Napier (1563); founder of the Church of Scotland and leader of the Protestant Reformation John Knox (1531); notable Leader of the Church of Scotland Thomas Chalmers; founder of and the first chancellor of the University of Glasgow William Turnbull; founder of the University of Edinburgh Robert Reid; founder of the world's first commercial savings bank Henry Duncan (1823); journalist and politician during the French Revolution Jean-Paul Marat (1775 MD); inventor of beta-blockers, H2 receptor antagonists and Nobel Prize in Medicine winner James W. Black (1946 MB ChB); the 'father of military medicine' Sir John Pringle, 1st Baronet; pioneer of the smallpox vaccine Edward Jenner (1792 MD); William, Prince of Wales (2005) and Catherine, Princess of Wales (2005).

Alumni in the fields of academia and education have gone on to found the University of Melbourne Medical School (Anthony Brownless) and the Scottish Church College in Calcutta (Alexander Duff was also the first Scottish missionary to India), become the first Regent and first principal of the University of Edinburgh (Robert Rollock), dean of Harvard Divinity School (David Hempton), the Vice Chancellors of Aberdeen University (Ian Diamond), University of Nottingham (Shearer West), Open University (Walter Perry was also the first vice-chancellor) and Sydney University (Gavin Brown), chancellor of the University of Maine System (James H. Page), provost of Eton College (Eric Anderson), discoverer of the Berry Phase (Sir Michael Berry) and inventor of the Leslie cube John Leslie.

In business and finance, St Andrews graduates have become the CEOs of multinational companies including BHP (Andrew Mackenzie), BP (Robert Horton), FanDuel (Nigel Eccles co-founded the company with fellow St Andrews graduate, Lesley Eccles), Rolls-Royce Holdings (John Rose), Royal Dutch Shell (Robert Paul Reid), Tate & Lyle (Iain Ferguson) and Royal Bank of Scotland (George Mathewson). Other notable businesspeople include Banker Olivier Sarkozy, director of the Edinburgh Festival Fringe Alistair Moffat and the CEO of Scottish Rugby Union and ATP World Tour Finals Phil Anderton.

Former St Andrews students active in politics and national intelligence include two Chiefs of MI6 Alex Younger and John Sawers, two deputy directors of the Secret Intelligence Service (MI6), George Kennedy Young and J. M. Bruce Lockhart, Secretary of State for Scotland Lord Forsyth (Forsyth is also former deputy chairman of JP Morgan), former First Minister of Scotland and leader of the SNP for over 20 years Alex Salmond, former Cabinet Secretary and head of the Civil Service Sir Mark Sedwill, former Secretary of State for Defence Sir Michael Fallon, Deputy Leader of the Liberal Democrats Malcolm Bruce and leader of the Christian Party James George Hargreaves. Outside of the UK, alumni include the financial secretary of Hong Kong credited with laying the foundations for Hong Kong's economic success John James Cowperthwaite, former senior director for European and Russian affairs on the United States National Security Council, Fiona Hill, David Holmes (both were involved in the Impeachment inquiry against Donald Trump), and the first female cabinet minister in Egypt Hikmat Abu Zayd. Alumni have also gone on to serve as diplomats including the current Permanent Representative of the United Kingdom to the United Nations and former British Ambassador to China (2015–2020) Dame Barbara Woodward, former ambassador to Russia (2008–2011) Dame Anne Pringle and Thomas Bruce who is known for the removal of the Elgin Marbles from the Parthenon.

Alumni from the media and the arts include founder of Forbes magazine B. C. Forbes, founder of The Week Jolyon Connell, former Downing Street Director of Communications and former controller of BBC World News Craig Oliver, Political Editor of BBC Scotland Brian Taylor, BBC News presenter Louise Minchin, BBC Sport TV presenter Hazel Irvine, editor of Tatler Richard Dennen, Primetime Emmy Award winning screenwriter David Butler, Pulitzer Prize winning author James Michener, feminist writer Fay Weldon, poet Len Pennie, musician The Pictish Trail and actors Siobhan Redmond, Crispin Bonham-Carter, Ian McDiarmid and Jonathan Taylor Thomas.

Other notable alumni include 'father of the poll tax' Douglas Mason, founders of the Adam Smith Institute, Madsen Pirie and Eamonn Butler, former Lord Justice General Lord Cullen, two currently sitting members of the Inner House, Lord Eassie and Baroness Clark of Calton, one of the leading figures in the formation of the United States Golf Association Charles B. Macdonald, the captain of Tottenham Hotspur F.C. during its double-winning season Danny Blanchflower, and the wildlife conservationist Saba Douglas-Hamilton.

The university also boasts of a rich roll of honorary graduates whose members vary from Benjamin Franklin to Hillary Clinton, from Bob Dylan to Arvo Pärt, from Maggie Smith to Sean Connery, from Nora K. Chadwick to Martha Nussbaum, from Joseph Stevenson to Lisa Jardine, from Seamus Heaney to Bahram Beyzai, from Georg Cantor to David Attenborough.

Academics

Notable University of St Andrews faculty include Nobel Prize in Medicine winner Maurice Wilkins (lecturer in physics 1945–1946) and discoverer of herring bodies Percy Theodore Herring (Chandos Chair of Medicine and Anatomy 1908–1948). The Morris water navigation task was developed by Richard Morris at the university's Gatty Marine Laboratory.

Anthropology
Paloma Gay y Blasco
Peter Gow
Ladislav Holý
Joanna Overing

Biology
Struther Arnott
Maria Dornelas
Patrick Geddes
Tracey Gloster
Adrian Horridge
Susan D. Healy
D'Arcy Wentworth Thompson

Business and Management
Meaghan Delahunt
Robert Gray

Chemistry
Peter Bruce
Rebecca Goss
Norman Haworth
James Irvine
Russell E Morris
James H Naismith
Catherine Steele
Michael Bühl
Classics
Walter Burkert
Lewis Campbell
Chris Carey
John Craig
Kenneth Dover
James Donaldson
Stephen Halliwell
Wallace Lindsay
William Lorimer

Computer Science
Jack Cole
Ian Gent

Divinity
John Adamson
Mario Aguilar
Robert Arnot
Donald Macpherson Baillie
Robert Baron
Richard Bauckham
Matthew Black
Ian Bradley
David Brown
Thomas Chalmers
Nicol Dalgleish
Ivor Davidson
George Duncan
Philip Esler
Timothy Gorringe
James Haldenston
Robert Halliday
Daphne Hampson
Alexander Henderson
George Hill
Nicholas Thomas Wright

Economics
Ralph Harris, Baron Harris of High Cross
David A. Jaeger
Clara Ponsatí i Obiols

Engineering
Angus Robertson Fulton

English, Literature, and Poetry
Michael J. Alexander
Meg Bateman
John Burnside
Robert Crawford
Douglas Dunn
Roger Lancelyn Green
Robert Irwin
Kathleen Jamie
John Johnston
A. L. Kennedy
William Angus Knight
Don Paterson

Languages and Linguistics
Peter Branscombe
George Hadow

Geology
Christopher Hawkesworth

History and Art History
G.W.S. Barrow
Robert Bartlett
Alison Beach
Paul Bibire
Michael Brown
George Buchanan
Nora K. Chadwick
Barrie Dobson
Norman Gash
John Guy
Robert Kerr Hannay
John Hudson
Martin Kemp
John Philipps Kenyon
Hamish Scott
Alex Woolf
Tomasz Kamusella

International Relations and Politics
Bruce Hoffman
John Lindsay of Balcarres, Lord Menmuir
Hew Strachan
David Veness
Paul Wilkinson

Mathematics and Astronomy
John Couch Adams
Rosemary A. Bailey
Kenneth Falconer
Eric Priest
James Gregory
John Mackintosh Howie
Douglas Samuel Jones
Peter Cameron

Media and Film Studies
Dina Iordanova

Medicine and Physiology
John Adamson
Oswald Taylor Brown
George Edward Day
Margaret Fairlie
John Forfar
Percy Theodore Herring
Robert Hunter
Joseph Fairweather Lamb

Philosophy and Logic
Thomas Spencer Baynes
Piers Benn
Bernard Bosanquet
C. D. Broad
Sarah Broadie
Herman Cappelen
Gershom Carmichael
Laurence Jonathan Cohen
James Main Dixon
James Drever
James Frederick Ferrier
John Joseph Haldane
Bob Hale
Geoffrey Hunter
Malcolm Knox
John Major
Graham Priest
John Skorupski
George Stout
Crispin Wright

Physics and Astronomy
H. Stanley Allen
John F. Allen
Adam Anderson
Sir Michael Berry
David Brewster
Charles Coulson
Dirk ter Haar
Emilios T. Harlaftis
Alan Hood
Thomas F Krauss
Johannes Kuenen
 Andrew P. Mackenzie FRS

Psychology
William Fitch
Kay Redfield Jamison
Malcolm Jeeves

Zoology
Ian L. Boyd
H. G. Callan
William Thomas Calman

In popular culture
The University of St Andrews has appeared in or been referenced by a number of popular media works, in film and literature.

Film
 West Sands Beach in St Andrews was used as a location for the film Chariots of Fire (1981), the scene, in which several of the main characters run along the beach, has become widely recognised and one of the most famous scenes in British film history.
 The student hall, Andrew Melville Hall, was used for location shooting of the 2010 film adaptation of Kazuo Ishiguro's novel, Never Let Me Go starring Keira Knightley and Carey Mulligan.

Literature
 In Enid Blyton's Malory Towers novel series, the main heroine Darrell Rivers plans to attend the University of St Andrews after Sixth Form with some of her fellow characters.
 St Andrews appeared in Samuel Johnson's travel narrative A Journey to the Western Islands of Scotland (1775), in which he visited the university.
 Bruce Marshall's romance novel, Girl in May (1956), is set in St Andrews.
 Adam Nevill's horror novel Banquet for the Damned (2004) takes place in St Andrews.
 Jay Parini's memoir Borges and Me (2020) recounts the author's road trip from St Andrews to the Highlands with Jorge Luis Borges.

See also

 :Category:Academics of the University of St Andrews
 Chancellor of the University of St Andrews
 St Andrews Cathedral
 List of medieval universities
 Gaudy
 Town and gown

Notes

References

Sources
 R.G. Cant The University of St Andrews, A Short History (Oliver and Boyd Ltd. 1946)

External links

 
 University of St Andrews Students' Association Website
 Research@StAndrews:FullText, the university's digital repository of research output
 BBC Your Paintings, Public Catalogue Foundation

 
1413 establishments in Scotland
Education in Fife
Educational institutions established in the 15th century
Universities in Scotland
15th-century establishments in Scotland
Universities UK